Xingfeng Subdistrict is a subdistrict in the northwestern portion of Daxing District, Beijing, China. It borders Qingyuan Subdistrict in its north, Guanyinsi Subdistrict in its east, Linxiao Road Subdistrict in its south, and Huangcun Town in its west and north. As of 2020, its population was 79,851.

The name Xingfeng came from Xingfeng Avenue, the most prosperous street within the area.

History

Administrative divisions 

By 2021, Xingfeng Subdistrict covered the following 17 communities:

Gallery

See also 

 List of township-level divisions of Beijing

References 

Daxing District
Subdistricts of Beijing